A heavy-lift ship is a vessel designed to move very large loads that cannot be handled by normal ships. They are of two types:
Semi-submersible ships that take on water ballast to allow the load—usually another vessel—to be floated over the deck, whereupon the ballast is jettisoned and the ship's deck and cargo raised above the waterline.
Project cargo ships that use at least one heavy-lift crane for handling heavy cargo and sufficient ballast to assure stability and sea-keeping properties.

Description 
There are several types of heavy-lift ships:

Semi-submersible ships
Semi-submersible heavy-lift ships have a long and low well deck between a forward pilot house and an aft machinery space. In superficial appearance, it is somewhat similar to a dry bulk carrier or some forms of oil tanker. Its ballast tanks can be flooded to lower the well deck below the water's surface, allowing oil platforms, other vessels, or other floating cargo to be moved into position for loading (float-on/float-off). The tanks are then pumped out, and the well deck rises to shoulder the load. To balance the cargo, the various tanks can be pumped unevenly.

Float-on/float off vessels transport oil drilling rigs. Such ships can carry the rigs from their construction site to a drilling site at roughly three to four times the speed of a self-deploying rig. Rapid deployment of the rig to the drilling site can translate into major savings. They also transport other out-sized cargo and yachts.

The U.S. Navy has used such ships to bring damaged warships back to the United States for repair. The first was the guided missile frigate , which was nearly sunk by a naval mine in the central Persian Gulf on 14 April 1988. The frigate was towed to Dubai, then floated home to Newport, Rhode Island, aboard .

Eleven years later,  transported the U.S. guided missile destroyer  from Aden, Yemen, to Pascagoula, Mississippi, after the warship was damaged in a bombing attack on 12 October 2000.

The U.S. Navy has also chartered other heavy lift ships to carry smaller craft, usually mine-countermeasure craft, or other patrol craft.  Since there are no US-flagged heavy float-on/float-off ships, the U.S. Navy normally relies on its Military Sealift Command to charter them from the world commercial market.

In 2004, Blue Marlin carried the world's largest semi-submersible oil platform, BP's , from the Daewoo Shipbuilding & Marine Engineering shipyard in South Korea to Kiewit Offshore Services in Ingleside, Texas.

One of the company's vessels, Mighty Servant 2, capsized and sank after hitting an uncharted single underwater isolated pinnacle of granite off Indonesia in November 1999.

Project cargo ships
Project cargo ships are non-submersible ships that load large and heavy cargo items with one or more on-board cranes. Such vessels have between 13,000 and 19,000 deadweight tonnage (DWT) capacity. Examples of cargo transported includes container cranes, bridge sections, and suction piles.

History
In the 1920s, the Bremen-based shipping company DDG Hansa saw a growing demand of shipments for assembled locomotives to British India. That led to the construction of the world's first heavy lift vessel,  with a  derrick.  After World War II, DDG Hansa became the world's largest heavy lift shipping company. In terms of lifting capacity it reached its peak in 1978 with refitting the Japanese-built bulk carrier MV Trifels with two  Stülcken derricks. Shortly after that, in 1980, DDG went bankrupt. With that, only the Dutch shipping companies Jumbo, BigLift Shipping (until 2001 named Mammoet Shipping) and SAL Heavy lift were left as heavy lift shipping specialists.

See also
 Semi-submersible naval vessel

References

External links

 Description of military heavy lift ships

 
Ship types
Submersible ships